Maluku is a municipality (commune) in the Tshangu district of Kinshasa, the capital city of the Democratic Republic of the Congo.

References

See also 

Communes of Kinshasa
Tshangu District